Seo Dong-Won (born August 14, 1975) is a South Korean former football player. He played for Daejeon Citizen, Suwon Samsung Bluewings, Jeonbuk Hyundai Motors, Gwangju Sangmu Bulsajo (army), Incheon United, Seongnam Ilhwa Chunma).and Busan I'Park.

Club career statistics

International goals
Results list South Korea's goal tally first.

References
 
 National Team Player Record 
 

1975 births
Living people
Association football midfielders
South Korean footballers
South Korea international footballers
Daejeon Hana Citizen FC players
Suwon Samsung Bluewings players
Jeonbuk Hyundai Motors players
Gimcheon Sangmu FC players
Incheon United FC players
Seongnam FC players
Busan IPark players
K League 1 players
2000 CONCACAF Gold Cup players
Footballers from Seoul
Yonsei University alumni